The 2007 Dunedin mayoral election re-elected Peter Chin as Mayor of Dunedin, New Zealand. The election was conducted under the Single transferable vote voting system.

Results
The following table shows the detailed results for the 13 October 2007 election:

References 

Mayoral elections in Dunedin
Dunedin
Politics of Dunedin
2000s in Dunedin
October 2007 events in New Zealand